Infinity Falls is a river raft ride manufactured by Intamin located at SeaWorld Orlando in Orlando, Florida. The ride opened on October 4, 2018, holding the record for tallest drop on a river raft ride.

History 
The 2008 purchase of Anheuser-Busch by Belgian brewer InBev led to the sale of Busch's parks to a private equity firm in 2009. The sale also led to the closure of the park's Hospitality Center on February 1, 2009. In 2010, the park opened its Sea Gardens, an area that featured daily animal interactions.

On April 13, 2017, SeaWorld Orlando announced "Infinity Falls" to open in 2018, with park officials comparing the ride to class IV river rapids experience. On August 10, 2017, SeaWorld Orlando filed a notice of commencement and began ground breaking work. Permits that were found on October 12, 2017 in Orange County, Florida showed details of construction, with PCL Construction looking over the work site. The ride raft was unveiled at International Association of Amusement Parks and Attractions (IAAPA) Attraction Exposition 2017.

Though the ride was installed by June 20, 2018, testing and finishing touches were still to be completed. In July 2018, a promotion was offered by the park to passholders for first access to the attraction. On July 18, 2018, the ride's tower was topped-out, and in the same month the park polled guests to naming some of the rafts. By August 2018, it was reported that the ride's delay in opening was attributed to testing and weather among several other circumstances. On September 19, 2018, the walls surrounding the area came down. Though the ride was still in testing, a media day was announced a few days later. Employee testing began on September 27, 2018, with the ride soft-opened on September 28, 2018 with an official opening set in October 2018. Infinity Falls officially opened on October 4, 2018. The former Hospitality Center became a restaurant known as the Waterway Grill which opened in September 2018.

Ride experience 
The area is themed to the conservation of water, varying from other attractions at the park where they're themed in conjunction with an animal or the ocean. As guests go through the queue area, they're introduced to the story line through the ride's queue and interactive games. The queue is of the idea that guests are explorers and scientists, part of the organization "S.E.A. Collective", settled in wetland camp along a river in the rainforest. A bridge connects the pathway to the area, with totems on either side depicting a parrot, a snake, a tree frog, and a sloth. Moreover, the connected area has pay to play water cannons that individuals use to soak people on the ride through telescopes that line the course.  

The course takes about 5 minutes to traverse.

Characteristics 

Infinity Falls is contained within a  space located within the Sea of Mystery area of the park. Four pumps that contain  each pump altogether  of water throughout the courses layout.

Raft names 
In addition to being numbered, each raft on Infinity Falls has its own name, most being play on words related to the ride experience.
 
 Winter Blue
 River Race
 Flying Colors
 Blue Paradise
 Aqua Falls
 Discovery
 River Falls
 Amazon Drop
 H2O
 Everfalls
 Marine Falls
 Expedition
 Rafty McRaftFace
 Sea Señora
 A Little Nauti

Records 
Upon opening, Infinity Falls held the record for the tallest drop on a river raft ride, which was previously held by River Quest in Phantasialand with a drop of 36 feet. It beat the record by 4 feet, making it 40 feet tall at its highest point.

Reception 
Infinity Falls was well received in the park. Prior to Infinity Falls' opening, the newest ride at SeaWorld Orlando was Mako, which opened in June 2016.

References

External links 

Amusement rides introduced in 2018
2018 establishments in Florida
SeaWorld Orlando
River rapids rides